Beijingxi (Beijing West) railway station, colloquially referred to as West Station, is located in western Beijing's Fengtai District. Opened in early 1996 after three years of construction, it was the largest railway station in Asia with an area of 510,000 m2, before being surpassed by Shanghai Hongqiao railway station in platform capacity. The station serves in average 150,000–180,000 passengers per day with a maximum of 400,000 people per day. It was expanded in 2000 and had a large number of parking spaces added.

Overview
The construction concept of Beijing West railway station began as early as 1959. It was planned and researched three times in history, but the first two were put on hold for political and economic reasons. For the third time, in 1989, the preparatory work, adjustment planning, and re-reporting were resumed and finally approved by the state. Beijing West railway station project was jointly funded by the Beijing Municipal Government and the Ministry of Railways. It was a key project in China's eighth five-year plan with a total investment of 6.5 billion yuan.

After the completion of the Beijing West railway station, the passenger pressure at the Beijing railway station was greatly alleviated. Beijing West station is the passenger train departure station of Beijing–Guangzhou high-speed railway, the two main railway lines in China: Beijing–Guangzhou railway (connected via the Beijing-Guangzhou railway west long link) and the Beijing–Kowloon railway, and a high-speed railway line. Most passenger trains in China's Central South, South China, Southwest, and Northwest China depart from Beijing West Railway Station. As of May 2011, Beijing West railway station had received more than 110 trains per day, of which about 100 departed. The Beijing underground cross-city railway, which passes through the urban area of Beijing and connects to Beijing railway station, was opened to traffic on 20 March 2015.

Beijing railway station is one of the transportation hubs in Beijing. There are bus hubs in North Square and South Square. A large number of buses depart from there; a taxi rank is also built underground; and the subway station reserved for construction has been completed by the end of 2011, a transfer station between Line 7 and Line 9.

Beijing West railway station's architectural style, building quality, design and planning have been criticised and controversial since its opening, but despite this, the station is still one of Beijing's most eye-catching buildings. At the end of 2007, the "Beijing New Landmarks Selection" event sponsored by the Beijing News announced the top ten new landmarks in Beijing after the public vote in January 2008. Beijing West railway station unexpectedly took 51,335 votes, second only to the National Stadium, becoming the new landmark in Beijing with the second most votes.

History

Background
As early as the 1950s, the concept of building the second passenger-railway station for Beijing and the underground diameter line had been formed. In the autumn of 1959, when the Beijing railway station, one of the “Ten Great Buildings” erected in celebration of the 10th anniversary of the National Day of the People's Republic of China, was just completed, the then Premier of the State Council, Zhou Enlai, during the process of reviewing the planning of Beijing's railway, affirmed the suggestion of a west passenger station in Beijing. In the general layout of the Beijing Railway Hub revised in September 1960, the idea at the time was to use Beijing West Railway Station and Beijing Railway Station as the main passenger terminal of the hub, and may connect the two major stations through the center of Beijing through four parallel underground tunnels. The site of the West Railway Station is directly opposite the Gongzhufen (Tomb of the Princess). The Beijing Municipal Government has correspondingly reserved land for the lotus pond that was still in the suburbs in the urban master plan. Therefore, for a long period of time thereafter, the lotus pond area has been a warehouse area dominated by simple bungalows. No permanent building has been constructed. However, due to the reduction in the scale of construction during the three-year difficult period, the planning has not made much progress. The subsequent start of the Cultural Revolution led to the suspension of the overall urban planning work in Beijing and the cancellation of the planning agency.

Planning

The first plan (1975–76)
In January 1975, the first session of the 4th National People's Congress was convened. Deng Xiaoping was elected Vice Premier of the State Council and began to preside over the daily work of the Central Committee and the State Council; Wan Li was then appointed as the Minister of Railways, responsible for rectifying the chaotic railway transportation system at that time; In March, the "Decision of the Central Committee of the Communist Party of China on Strengthening Railway Work" was issued as a mobilization order for the comprehensive rectification of the railway, and it soon achieved results, and then proposed to build the Beijing West railway station again. At that time, the railway department and planning department were still very vague about the location and construction plan of Beijing West railway station. There was no detailed design before, and whether the planned underground diameter line was retained or not, and the technical plan was not finalized, resulting in the design of Beijing West railway station. It is difficult to decide whether to choose through or end. As agreed by the Ministry of Railways and the Beijing Municipal Government, it was decided to jointly establish a planning working group to be responsible for researching and selecting the site and construction plan of the West Railway Station. The Third Design Institute of the Ministry of Railways (now China Railway Design Group Co., Ltd.) and Beijing Architectural Design Institute (Now Beijing Architectural Design and Research Institute Co., Ltd.) were responsible for specific technical work.

After some investigation, comparison and discussion, the planning working group came up with the preliminary plan for Beijing West railway station in November 1975 and determined that the Beijing West station was a pass-through station. The station's site is located at the southwest corner of Lianhua Bridge. The road runs northwest–southeast, adopts a triangular square, and the station faces the center of the overpass. However, the political situation changed again soon after, affected by the "Counterattack the Right-Deviationist Reversal-of-Verdicts Trend" in 1976, and the site plan was shelved without approval.

The second plan (1981–85)
Into the 1980s, with the gradual implementation of the reform and opening up policy, the pressure of China's railway transportation infrastructure has increased greatly, and transportation capacity is tight. By 1981, Beijing's railway passenger traffic had increased sharply, and 108 pairs of passenger trains were running every day in the central station, with an average daily passenger volume of 352,000; Beijing Station, as the largest railway passenger station in Beijing at that time, was already overloaded in operation, the annual passenger flow of Beijing Station in 1981 was 27.72 million, equivalent to 78,000 passengers per day. On 3 October 1981, the then Mayor of Beijing Jiao Ruoyu and Secretary of the Municipal Party Committee Duan Junyi reported on Beijing's railway transport situation to Vice Premier Wan Li and talked about the design and planning of the Beijing West Railway Station. This was the third such occurrence in the history of Beijing Municipal Government. It is proposed to construct the Beijing West station as soon as possible. In early December 1981, the Beijing Railway Bureau issued a letter to the Ministry of Railways and the Beijing Municipal Government to apply for the construction of the Beijing West Railway Station, and the preliminary design was officially launched. Subsequently, the planning team headed by former Minister of Railways Lu Zhengcao, together with personnel from the Ministry of Railways, Beijing Railway Administration, and the Third Design Institute of the Ministry of Railways, conducted on-site inspections to select the site for the station. The team members once climbed the Xiaotu Mountain on the north bank of the lotus pond to get an overview of the local area. Due to the dry season at that time and the excessive extraction of groundwater in the lotus pond area over the years, more than 20 hectares of ponds were dried up, overgrown with weeds, and deserted; the design team believed that this area did not occupy arable land and there would be less demolition, which was in line with the plan and saved money. It instructed the Third Design Institute of the Ministry of Railways on the spot to arrange the West Station at this location, and the design drawings needed to be submitted within three months. After the meeting, the group forwarded the site selection opinions to the Beijing Municipal Government for comments.

The third plan (1989–1993)
By the end of the 1980s, the problem of tight passenger capacity in the central Beijing railway hub became more and more serious. It was more difficult to cope with demand by relying solely on one main passenger station and two auxiliary passenger station (Beijing North and Beijing South) with insufficient equipment and capacity. Those three stations have not been expanded on a large scale for more than 30 years, and the passenger volume of the Beijing area has increased four-fold from 1970 to 1988. The construction of the Beijing West railway station has become an urgent need. In February 1989, the Beijing Municipal Government again formally proposed the construction of the Beijing West station. In March of the same year, the Beijing Municipal Government led the establishment of the "Beijing West Railway Station Preliminary Working Group", which convened a number of design institutes with certain strengths across the country to conduct an architectural design competition. At the same time, with the approval of the State Council, the pre-relocation works for the construction of the Beijing West station were launched during 1989. Involving the Xibianmen Goods Yard of Guang'anmen railway station and many factories and residential areas at Beijing West, the process had been large, difficult, and costly.  At that time, the state's total investment in the project was 2.3 billion yuan, with the demolition alone costing more than one billion yuan.

In March 1990, the working group compiled and reported the "Beijing West Railway Station Plan and Tasks", and the Yangfangdian Road plan that reached a consensus as early as 1983 was officially "thawed". Since August 1990, the architectural plans of 7 design units have been selected. After several rounds of demonstration and selection of various design plans, the implementation design plan had been determined. On 30 September 1990, the Beijing Municipal Government, the Ministry of Railways, and the Ministry of Posts and Telecommunications submitted to the State Planning Commission the document "On the basis of the revised plan for the Beijing West Railway Station", and proposed an investment of 2 billion yuan. Construction started in 1991 and opened in 1993. Used, the finishing work was completed in 1994. In March 1991, the State Council formally approved the design specification of the Beijing West station.

Renovation and Expansion 
The designed capacity of Beijing West Railway Station is 60 to 70 pairs of trains per day, but the actual number of trains sent during the Spring Festival peak period is as high as 90 to 100 pairs. This overload operation has caused great pressure on the already imperfect station facilities. In 2001, the Beijing Municipal Government took advantage of Beijing's bid for the Olympic Games to launch the "Beijing First Impression" project aimed at the Capital Airport and its surrounding areas, as well as major railway stations in Beijing and its surrounding environment. Public facilities and places have been comprehensively renovated and renovated, but the capacity of the West Railway Station to receive and dispatch trains is still tight. In the second half of 2003, the Ministry of Railways and the Beijing Railway Bureau started the second phase project of Beijing West Railway Station, adding three platforms 7, 8 and 9 on the basis of the original 6 platforms. After the completion of the project, Beijing West Railway Station can send trains daily. Boosted to 137 pairs. At the same time, a large-scale transformation of the station platform has been carried out, including improving lighting facilities, transforming awnings, and raising the platform. On October 2 of the same year, the entry-exit joint inspection hall of Beijing West Railway Station was opened for passengers of the Beijing-Kowloon through train (Z97 times), so the Beijing-Kowloon through train no longer stopped at Changping Station. The renovated Beijing West Railway Station canopy is the first large-span steel structure canopy in China.

In 2005, in order to cooperate with the closure of Beijing South Railway Station, the Beijing West Railway Station expanded the No. 9 platform and newly built the No. 10 platform to divert part of the passenger flow of Beijing South Railway Station. In addition, in the expansion project, the canopies of platforms 1 to 7 were rebuilt at the same time, and the canopies of platforms 8 to 10 were newly built, using large-span, arc-shaped, steel truss-structured canopies without platform columns.

In February 2009, more than 13 million passengers got on and off at the Beijing West Railway Station during the 2009 Spring Festival, setting a record high since the station was established.

According to the "Medium and Long-Term Railway Network Planning (2008 Adjustment)", the incoming routes of the Beijing hub have been adjusted accordingly. The Beijing Railway Hub has formed a layout of seven passenger stations including Beijing Railway Station, Beijing South Railway Station, Beijing West Railway Station, Beijing North Railway Station, Tongzhou Railway Station, Xinghuo Railway Station and Fengtai Railway Station. Due to the delay of the reconstruction and expansion plan of Fengtai Station, Beijing-Shijiazhuang Passenger Dedicated Line will be introduced to Beijing West Station in the near future, and Fengtai Station will be introduced after the new station of Fengtai Station is completed. For this reason, Beijing West Railway Station needs to carry out the largest reconstruction since its construction. The “Approval for the Preliminary Design of the Station Building Reconstruction Project” document, Beijing West Railway Station will be transformed in four aspects: the elevated waiting room, the passenger service system project, the VIP waiting room in the South Station Building, and the related transformation of the hub transfer facilities. There is a patio in the elevated waiting room between the second and ninth platforms, adding an elevated waiting space of 6,600 square meters; adding paper magnetic card ticket making machines, automatic ticket machines and necessary network equipment; adding the second floor of the South Station Ticket Center Transformed into a VIP area; and opened up the south exit of the east and west outbound passages, so that passengers can directly access the South Square transportation hub. The renovation project of the elevated waiting room was originally planned to start in early April 2012. Affected by this, a total of 159 trains were adjusted for this purpose. However, the railway department considered that the expansion of the elevated waiting room would not only have a high budgetary cost, but would also affect the erection of the elevated waiting room. Due to the inconvenience caused by the platform of the column, the renovation project of the elevated waiting room was finally cancelled, and the existing waiting room resources were used to allocate the passenger flow of the Beijing-Shijiazhuang Passenger Dedicated Line.

The Beijing Underground Diameter Line, which was proposed as early as 1959 and connects Beijing Railway Station and Beijing West Railway Station, started construction in December 2005, and was completed and opened to traffic on March 20, 2015. The underground Diameter Line enables both Beijing Railway Station and Beijing West Railway Station to receive and dispatch passenger trains from the Beijing-Harbin Line and other directions. According to the railway development plan, the capacity of Beijing West Railway Station will continue to increase year by year. It is estimated that by 2020, the number of trains arriving and departing from Beijing West Railway Station will reach 137 pairs, including 79 pairs of high-speed trains.

Services

China Railway

Beijing West railway station is a terminal for both "traditional" and high-speed trains. It is the Beijing terminal for most trains leaving the city for destinations in western and southwestern China, including Xi'an, Chongqing, Chengdu, Lhasa and Urumqi. Major "traditional" rail lines beginning at this station include the Beijing-Guangzhou railway (via Wuhan) and the Beijing–Kowloon railway (via Nanchang and Shenzhen).

Beijing West is the terminal both for the Beijing–Kowloon through train and (since the opening of the Qingzang railway in 2006) for the Beijing-Lhasa trains.

Beijing West is the northern terminal of the Beijing–Guangzhou high-speed railway as of December 2012. High-speed trains leave the station for Guangzhou and Shenzhen, as well as various destinations on the connecting lines, such as Taiyuan and Xi'an. There are, however, plans to construct a new major railway terminal (the new Fengtai railway station) in the southwestern part of Beijing, and to eventually make it the terminal for the high-speed trains on the Beijing-Guangzhou line.

The Beijing underground cross-city railway connects Beijing West with Beijing railway station.

Destinations

Beijing Subway

 This station is served by Line 7 and Line 9. Passengers are able to change between Line 7 and Line 9 using the cross-platform interchange method. The Subway concourse is on the Arrivals level, with all platforms a level further below. This station was the terminus of Line 9 until it was extended north to National Library on December 30, 2012.

Beijing Bus
 Beijing Bus stops:
Beijing West Station: 9, 21, 40, 47, 50, 52, 54, 65, 67, 83, 89, 99, 205, 209, 212, 213, 301, 319, 320, 373, 374, 387, 414, 437, 616, 623, 661, 662, 663, 673, 694, 695, 741, 840, 843, 845, 901, 
Beijing West Station South Square: 53, 72, 109, 122, 309, 349, 410, 616, 820, 890, 941, 982, 993,
Beijing Airport Bus: Route 7
Bus route numbers in bold denotes terminus at the stop.

Station layout

China Railway 
Regular rail services leave from Platforms 1–11; HSR leaves from Platforms 12–18. A dedicated exit is used for passengers arriving on Platform 18.

All passengers will leave Beijing West from the Level 2 Departures Hall, except for passengers to Hung Hom terminus in Hong Kong, who must enter from a dedicated entrance with immigration and customs clearance facilities located by North Entrance 1. These passengers will clear customs and immigration at Beijing West and will not leave the train until it arrives at the Kowloon / Hung Hom terminus in Hong Kong. A VIP lounge is available for Business Class passengers travelling HSR.

Ticket counters and machines are available beside the main entrances.

Beijing Subway 
The station has dual-island platforms with a cross platform interchange between lines 7 and 9. On one side, originating line 7 trains interchange with southbound line 9 trains towards Guogongzhuang, whilst on the other, terminating line 7 trains interchange with northbound line 9 trains towards National Library.

References

External links

 Beijing West Railway Station 
 Beijing Huoche Zhan Network 
 Beijing Railways Time Table

Railway stations in Beijing
Railway stations in China opened in 1996
Stations on the Beijing–Kowloon Railway
Stations on the Beijing–Guangzhou Railway
Stations on the Beijing–Xiong'an intercity railway
China–Hong Kong border crossings
Railway stations in China opened in 2011
Beijing Subway stations in Fengtai District